Alminhas or Nichos de Alminhas do Purgatório are a type of wayside shrine typical of Póvoa de Varzim, Portugal. These small shrines are mostly urban and represent souls in Purgatory.

Alminhas are located in several streets of the city, often at crossroads. They are generally stonework, with a small niche protected by an iron grid that is kept by the Confraria das Almas (Souls Brotherhood), with an azulejo panel invoking the souls of Purgatory. Older alminhas in the city center such as Rua da Conceição-Rua Primeiro de Maio Alminha or Rua dos Ferreiros-Praça do Almada Alminha have a more elaborate niche, resembling an altarpiece.

Traditionally, passers-by would pray and offer alms when passing one in the street. Candles, flowers and alms can be place in the niche. All the city's alminhas are well preserved and kept by the brotherhood. However, due to theft and damage of the shrines, some alminhas no longer accept alms.

List

Incomplete list, with year and crossroad location:
Alminha: Rua da Conceição - Rua Primeiro de Maio;
1824 Alminha: Rua de São Pedro - Rua da Moita;
1874 Alminha: Rua Corregedor Gaspar Cardoso - Rua dos Muros Altos;
Alminha: Rua Bonitos de Amorim - Largo das Dores;
1953 Alminha: Rua Gomes de Amorim - Praça Luís de Camões;
1966 Alminha: Rua Bonitos de Amorim - Rua Comendador Francisco Quintas;
1971 Alminha: Rua Leonardo Coimbra - Rua de Camilo;
Alminha: Rua dos Ferreiros - Praça do Almada;
Alminha: Avenida dos Pescadores - Rua das Flores;
Alminha: Travessa de Regufe - Rua de São Brás;
Niche: Rua António Silveira - Rua Tenente Veiga Leal;

Roman Catholic shrines in Portugal
Buildings and structures in Póvoa de Varzim
Religious buildings and structures in Portugal